Summer Go! is the fourth extended play from South Korean boy band UP10TION. It was released on August 5, 2016, by TOP Media. The album consists of six tracks, including the title track, "Tonight".

Commercial performance
The EP sold 73,561+ copies in South Korea. It peaked at number 1 on the Korean Gaon Chart.

Track listing

References 

2016 EPs
Korean-language EPs
Kakao M EPs
Up10tion EPs